Andrew Lawrence Donlin (born 9 October 1992) is an American professional handball player and a United States Air Force Captain. His nickname is Captain America.

High school
He played American football, basketball and baseball for the Wayzata High School.

College
He attend the United States Air Force Academy in 2011.

He attended at walk-on tryout for the football team they encouraged him that he should play handball. Later he joined the USAFA Team Handball.

In 2012 he played the 2019 IHF Trophy Tournament PATHF–North America Zone in Mexico City with the United States men's national junior handball team. They lost the small final 38–40 against Canada.

In 2014 he became top scorer with 27 goals at the 2014 USA Team Handball College Nationals - Men's Division. They won the bronze medal.

At the 2015 Summer Universiade the USAFA Team Handball club represented the national team. He was captain of the team. They had additionally one student from the Colorado State University. They finished 13th out of 13 teams.

He finished the academy with a Bachelor of Science degree in  Management.

Adult
In July 2015 after graduation he was assigned as Acquisition Program Manager at the Space and Missile Systems Center in Los Angeles.

In 2016 he made his United States men's national handball team debut at the 2016 Pan American Men's Handball Championship. The team reached finished in 8th place out of 12. His United States national beach handball team debut came the same year at the 2016 Beach Handball World Championships. This was the first World Championship appearance for the US and Donlin was the top scorer of the team.

At the 2018 Pan American Men's Beach Handball Championship he was the top scorer of the tournament and the team won the bronze medal.

He finished sixth in scoring at the 2018 Men's Beach Handball World Championships.

He played for the Los Angeles THC at the 2019 USA Team Handball Nationals - Men's Open Division, as they won the title.

In November 2018 he became a member of the United States Air Force World Class Athlete Program.

In December 2018 he played his first game for TSV Bayer Dormagen (DE).

He played at the 2019 Pan American Games.

He played for the United States team that won the 2019 Nor.Ca. Men's Beach Handball Championship, which qualified them for the 2019 World Beach Games The team finished 5th at the 2019 IHF Emerging Nations Championship.

He played for the Los Angeles THC at the 2019 North American and the Caribbean Senior Club Championship (3rd) and 2019 USA Team Handball Nationals - Men's Elite Division (4th).

In August 2019 he joined CB Ademar León, a professional Liga ASOBAL club. He became the first American handball player to play in a European club competition when he played in the 2019–20 EHF Cup. Ademar León were eliminated in the group stage.

In 2020 he was awarded with the 2019 United States Air Force Athlete of the Year title.

In August 2021 he left the World Class Athlete Program and joined the newly formed United States Space Force as Program Manager, Special Programs in Los Angeles. Upon his return to the United States, he joined San Francisco CalHeat, the USA Team Handball reigning champion, and won the 2021 North American and Caribbean Senior Club Championship, a qualifying tournament for the IHF Men's Super Globe.

Family
He is the oldest of four children and his sister, Colleen Donlin, is an NCAA Division I swimmer at Liberty University in Lynchburg, Virginia. In 2020 he extended his contract. The club doesn't pay him anything because he is paid via the World Class Athlete Program.

Ranks

References

External links
Profile at USA Team Handball
Profile at European Handball Federation
Profile at United States Air Force World Class Athlete Program
Profile at LinkedIn

1992 births
Living people
American male handball players
Air Force Falcons team handball
United States Air Force World Class Athlete Program
United States Air Force Athlete of the Year
American expatriate sportspeople in Spain
People from Plymouth, Minnesota